Tfail is a village in eastern Baalbek District, Baalbek-Hermel Governorate, Lebanon. It is one of the highest villages in Lebanon. It has a population of about 3,000 Sunni residents and is the most remote village in Lebanon, lying at the tip of a finger of territory that juts into Syria.

On 1 May 2014, Tfail was the target of Syrian barrel bomb attacks. During the Qalamoun offensive (June–August 2014), the village was surrounded by Hezbollah and Syrian Army forces. Tfail is also considered one of the highest villages in Lebanon with an elevation of 1660 meters.

References

Populated places in Baalbek District
Sunni Muslim communities in Lebanon